Michael Mark Brodsky (born Aug 2, 1948) is a scientific/medical editor, novelist, playwright, and short story writer.  He is best known for his novels Xman and ***, as well as for his translation of Samuel Beckett's Eleuthéria.

Early life and education
Michael Brodsky was born in New York City, the son of Martin and Marian Brodsky.  He attended the Bronx High School of Science.  He received a 1969 BA from Columbia College, Columbia University, taught math and science in New York for a year, attended Case Western Reserve University medical school for two years, then taught French and English in Cleveland until 1975.

Brodsky returned to New York City in 1976, working as an editor for the Institute for Research on Rheumatic Diseases.  He married Laurence Lacoste.  They are the parents of two children, Joseph Matthew and Matthew Daniel.  From 1985 to 1991, Brodsky was an editor with Springer-Verlag.  After 1991, he was with the United Nations.

Brodsky lives on Roosevelt Island.

Bibliography

Novels
Detour, 1978
 Circuits, 1983
 Xman, Four Walls Eight Windows, 1987
 Dyad, Four Walls Eight Windows, 1989
 ***, Four Walls Eight Windows, 1994
 We Can Report Them, Four Walls Eight Windows, 1999

Short stories
 Wedding Feast, 1981
 Project, 1982
 X in Paris, 1988
 Three Goat Songs, 1991
 Southernmost, 1996
 Limit Point, 2007

Plays
 Terrible Sunlight, 1980
 Packet Piece, 1982
 No Packet Piece, 1982
 Dose Center, 1990
 Night of the Chair, 1990
 Six Scenes: A Barracks Brawl, 1994
 The Anti-Muse, reading 1996, performance 2000

Translation
 Eleuthéria, by Samuel Beckett, written 1947, suppressed, published 1995

Nonfiction
"Svevo: The Artist as Analyzand", Review of Existential Psychology and Psychiatry, 15 no. 2-3 (1977), pp 112–133.
"Toward the Plane of the Sacred: Hafftka’s Great Chain of Being" essay in the catalogue for Michael Hafftka "A Retrospective: Large Oils 1985-2003" (2004).

Further reading

A short biography, and brief summaries of Brodsky's longer fiction and critical reception can be found here:
Herman, Peter G., "Michael Brodsky", World Authors, 1995-2000 Ed. Clifford Thompson and Mari Rich. New York: H. W. Wilson Company (2003). pp 113–115.
Contemporary Authors New Revision Series, vol 147 (2006) pp 56–8.

Brief summaries of his shorter fiction, critical reception, and quotations from Brodsky on his own fiction, can be found here:
Hawley, John C., "Michael Brodsky (2 August 1948-)", American Short-Story Writers Since World War II, Fourth Series. Ed. Patrick Meanor and Joseph McNicholas. Dictionary of Literary Biography Vol. 244. Detroit: Gale Group, 2001. pp 34–39. Online here.

References
CANRS refers to Contemporary Authors New Revision Series, and DLB refers to Dictionary of Literary Biography.  Full citations are above.

American editors
Postmodernists
Living people
1948 births
Columbia College (New York) alumni
People from Roosevelt Island